Eardrum is the third studio album by American hip hop artist Talib Kweli. The album was released on August 21, 2007, by Blacksmith Records and Warner Bros. Records. The album features guest appearances from Res, Jean Grae, UGK,  Raheem DeVaughn, Roy Ayers, Kanye West, Norah Jones, Coi Mattison, Lyfe Jennings, will.i.am, Sa-Ra, KRS-One, Musiq Soulchild, Strong Arm Steady, Sizzla, Justin Timberlake and Marsha Ambrosius.

Reception

Critical response
Eardrum scored 73 out of 100 from Metacritic based on "generally favorable reviews". Some than most reviews are average or mixed: Uncut gave it a score of three stars out of five and said, "Kweli, whose wordy rhymes can often read better than they flow, sounds nimble and at ease most of the time." Vibe gave it three stars out of five and said it "lacks cohesiveness." Spin gave it a score of five out of ten and said, "Though Kweli can't change his voice he was born with, he needs to figure out how to make it as compelling as his material." Hot Press gave it an above average review, however, and said, "Kweli's collaborative work has set the bar so high that his solo efforts routinely fail to meet these exalted expectations."

Metacritic, XXL gave it a score of XL (the equivalent of four out of five stars) and said, "Unlike 2004’s The Beautiful Struggle, which clumsily juxtaposed grungy backpack beats with basic mainstream medleys, Eardrum is a more sonically cohesive endeavor. Having more fun with the music and ignoring his critics, Talib wants to proves about sometimes, the only one worth listening to is yourself". HipHopDX gave it four stars out of five and said, "There is still room for improvement, but this largely the album from Kweli that everyone has been waiting for." AllHipHop gave it a score of 8.5 out of 10 and said it "still delivers enough solid work to be worth checking out no matter what your expectations." About.com gave it a score of four-and-a-half stars out of five and said, "While it's questionable as to whether Eardrum can hold up against his previous classics, it is without a doubt that this is most certainly Talib Kweli’s most effective release to date." AbsolutePunk gave it a score of 74% and said, "Though highly inconsistent due to its extraordinary number of songs, Eardrum impresses as a whole, making the early cop out absolutely unneeded. Talib Kweli refuses to disappoint". Los Angeles Times gave it a favorable review and said, "Kweli's commanding delivery and the well-executed songs on his sixth album... consistently provide pointed commentary... and masterful production".

Commercial performance
Eardrum debuted at number 2 on the US Billboard 200, selling 60,000 copies in its first week, marking it as Kweli's highest-debuting album to date. In its second week, the album fell down to number 20, selling 25,000 copies, in total of 85,500 copies in the United States. As of 2013, the album has sold 239,000 copies in United States.

Track listing

Chart positions

Weekly charts

Year-end charts

References

External links

Eardrum Review at Billboard

2007 albums
Talib Kweli albums
Warner Records albums
Albums produced by Pete Rock
Albums produced by will.i.am
Albums produced by Kanye West
Albums produced by Just Blaze
Albums produced by Hi-Tek
Albums produced by Madlib
Albums produced by Nick Speed
Albums produced by Terrace Martin
Albums produced by DJ Khalil
Albums produced by Battlecat (producer)
Albums produced by Sa-Ra